Ekta Bhyan (born 1985) is a para athlete who represents India in the women's club and discus throw events. She represented the country in the 2018 Asian Para Games held at Jakarta, Indonesia and won gold medal in the club throw event. She qualified for the Tokyo 2020 Paralympics, following her second consecutive appearance in the World Para Athletics Championships (London 2017 and Dubai 2019). She has also competed and won medals in several IPC Grand Prix held at Berlin in 2016, Dubai in 2017 and Tunisia in 2018.

Bhyan is the hailing national champion, having secured gold medal in the 2016, 2017 and 2018 National Para Athletics Championships. She received the National Award for Empowerment of Persons with Disabilities in 2018 and the State Award by Honourable Governor of Haryana on Women's Day, 2019.

She is also supported by the GoSports Foundation through the Para Champions Programme.

Early life
Bhyan was born in 1985 in Hissar, Haryana to retired district horticulture officer Baljeet Bhyan. She has two siblings.

In 2003, Ekta met with a road accident damaging her spinal cord.  In 2015, she started playing as a way to get fitness back. She met athlete Amit Saroha, who inspired her to become a para-athlete like him. She started her training in discus throw events. She went through two operations and a lot of hard work for her rehabilitation which made her confident.

Education
Bhyan completed her graduation and post-graduation in English from Hissar. She also, completed her bachelor's degree in education from Hissar and was selected as English PGT in Haryana Government. In 2011, she cleared the Haryana civil services exam and joined as an assistant employment officer.

Career 
Bhyan took up sports after an accident and was coached by Amit Saroha in club and discus throw. Her competitive career started with the 2016 IPC Grand Prix held at Berlin in July, where she bagged silver medal in club throw. She then competed in the 2016 National Para Athletics Championship held at Panchkula where she won gold medal in club throw and bronze medal in discus throw.

In 2017, she competed for the second time in the National Championship and secured gold medal in both the events. She also competed in the 2017 IPC Grand Prix held at Dubai. She was ranked 4th overall and set a new Asian record in both events. That year, Bhyan also competed in her first World Para Athletics Championship held at London, UK where she was ranked 6th internationally and 1st in Asia, in club throw.

Bhyan, already the reigning national champion, completed her third stint at the National Championship, held in 2018 at Panchkula, bagging gold medal in both events. That year, she had her eyes set on the 2018 Asian Para Games to be held in October at Jakarta, Indonesia and was in preparation mode throughout the year. She followed up with the 2018 IPC Grand Prix held at Tunisia winning Gold in club throw and Bronze in discus throw.

In October 2018, Bhyan won India's fourth gold at the Asian Para Games by topping the women's club throw event in Kuala Lumpur. She produced her best throw in her fourth attempt, 16.02m, winning the F32/51 event ahead of UAE's Alkaabi Thekra, who threw 15.75m. Bhyan became the second Indian woman to win gold medal at the Asian Para Games and the very first from her home-state, Haryana.

In 2019 had her second stint at the World Para Athletics Championship and won the Paralympic quota for Tokyo 2020 in the Women's Para Athletics category during World Para Athletics Championship, Dubai, 2019.

Bhyan works as an employment officer with the Haryana Government. She was awarded as ESPN's Para Athlete of the year for 2018.

Awards

Achievements

Asian Para Games

World Para Athletics Championships

IPC Grand Prix

† Set a new Asian record

National Para Athletics Championships

References 

1985 births
Living people
People from Hisar (city)
Female club throwers
Indian female discus throwers
Paralympic athletes of India
Athletes (track and field) at the 2020 Summer Paralympics